The 1963 World Modern Pentathlon Championships were held in Macolin, Switzerland.

Medal summary

Men's events

Medal table

See also
 World Modern Pentathlon Championships

References

 Sport123

World Modern Pentathlon Championships, 1963
Modern pentathlon in Europe
World Modern Pentathlon Championships, 1963
International sports competitions hosted by Switzerland
Sport in Bern